Dorcadion gebleri is a species of beetle in the family Cerambycidae. It was described by Kraatz in 1873.

Subspecies
 Dorcadion gebleri demimetrum Plavilstshikov, 1958
 Dorcadion gebleri gebleri Kraatz, 1873
 Dorcadion gebleri lukhtanovi Danilevsky, 1996
 Dorcadion gebleri takyr Danilevsky, 1996

See also 
Dorcadion

References

gebleri
Beetles described in 1873